Chahar Afra (also Romanized as Chahār Afrā) is a village in Harazpey-ye Shomali Rural District, Sorkhrud District, Mahmudabad County, Mazandaran Province, Iran. At the 2006 census, its population was 326, in 82 families.

References 

Populated places in Mahmudabad County